Aziz Mekouar (born 13 November 1950, Fes) is a Moroccan diplomat who has been serving as Ambassador to China (2018–present), the United States of America (2002-2011, making him the longest serving Moroccan Ambassador in Washington), Italy and the Order of Malta (1999-2002), Portugal (1993-1999), and Angola (1985-1993). He was appointed in 2016 by the King of Morocco on the Steering Committee as Ambassador to Multilateral Negotiations of COP22. He is the longest serving Moroccan Ambassador, and the only one to have been appointed to six different mandates.

He also served as Independent Chairman of the Council of the Food and Agriculture Organization (FAO), and as a special adviser to the Presidency at the Banque Marocaine du Commerce Exterieur (BMCE) and board member at the Bank of Africa.

Personal life
Aziz Mekouar is a member of the highly aristocratic Mekouar family from Fes, which includes historical figures such as Hajj Taoudi Mekouar (d. 1189), Hajj Mohamed Mekouar (d. 1263), and Hajj Haddou Mekouar (d. 1232) who founded a rich lineage of prominent figures in government and business throughout the history of the country, and who were granted ‘Dahir’ privileges from several dynasties of sultans.

Aziz Mekouar is the grandson of the Moroccan nationalist Hajj Ahmed Mekouar (1892-1988), who is best known for being the first person to sign the Proclamation of Independence from the French, a ceremony that took place in the Mekouar Palace in Fes. He is the great-great-grandson of Hajj Ahmed Mekouar (1819-1886), Honorary Consul of Great-Britain and owner of a sugar and textile trade conglomerate with France and the United Kingdom, and the great-grandnephew of Minister of Foreign Affairs Hajj Mohammed Mekouar. Aziz is the son of Hajj Tahar Mekouar, who served as Ambassador in Lisbon and Rome then as Diplomatic Chief of Protocol to King Hassan II, and Hajjah Aïcha Benjelloun. Through his mother, he is the grandson of the former minister of Finance and minister of Justice Abdelkader Benjelloun, and the cousin of business magnate Othman Benjelloun. His maternal grandmother came from the Khrifia lineage of descendants of the Prophet Mohammed.

He is married to Italian aristocrat Marquise Maria Felice Cittadini Cesi and has one son.

Aziz Mekouar is a member of several clubs, such as the Metropolitan Club in Washington DC and Chevy Chase Club in Bethesda MD.

Education
Aziz Mekouar attended the Lycée Français Chateaubriand in Rome, the Lycée Français Charles Lepierre in Lisbon, followed by his preparatory classes at Lycée Louis le Grand, and obtained a graduate degree from HEC Paris in 1974.

He is fluent in Arabic, English, French, Italian, Portuguese, and Spanish.

Career
Aziz Mekouar was the ambassador of Morocco to Angola (1986-1993) and to Portugal (1993-1999). Mr Mekouar served as ambassador to Italy Malta, Albania and Sovereign Order of Malta (1999-2002). He was elected Independent Chairman of the Council of the Food and Agriculture Organization (FAO) in November 2001 and re-elected in 2003. He had previously been appointed ambassador to the United States from June 19, 2002 until 2011. He participated in the negotiation of the Morocco and United States free trade agreement and the Millennium Challenge Account wherein the United States granted US$697 million for Moroccan development projects.

Today he is an independent advisor and consultant for a number of different companies.

Interfaith activities
As ambassador Mekouar made outreach to Jewish and evangelical Christians one of his priorities, he has helped organize numerous events promoting Christian-Muslim understanding.

Other functions
During his career, Mr Mekouar has also held other positions of responsibility, including: 
Minister plenipotentiary at the Ministry of Foreign Affairs and Cooperation in Morocco (1985-1986)
Permanent representative of Morocco to the International Bureau for Information Technology (1978-1985). 
First counselor and deputy chief of mission at the Embassy of Morocco in Rome (1977-1985).
Chairman of the financial committee of the Food and Agriculture Organization (FAO) Member and head of Moroccan delegations to several international conferences (1999 – 2005).
Chairman of the African Group of the UN organizations in Rome (2000-2005).
In 2008, Mekouar was appointed board member of Amorfix Life Sciences, a theranostics company developing therapeutic products and diagnostic devices targeting misfolded protein diseases including ALS, cancer, and Alzheimer's disease

Publications
Thesis on Fisheries and their contribution to the development of Argentina (1973).
Studies on "Asia-Dollar" and its future impact on the development of Southeast Asia (1974).
30 years of Italian Domestic Policy (1983).
30 years of Italian Foreign Policy (1983).

Decorations
Grand Cross of the Order of Merit of Portugal.
Grand Cross of the Military Order of Christ (Portugal).
Grand Cross of the Order of Merit of Italy.

References

External links
 Kingdom of Morocco Ministry of Foreign Affairs and Cooperation

21st-century diplomats
Living people
1950 births
Ambassadors of Morocco to the United States
People from Fez, Morocco
Ambassadors of Morocco to Italy
Ambassadors of Morocco to Angola
Ambassadors of Morocco to Portugal
Moroccan civil servants